Tongliao (Tüŋliyou qota, Mongolian Cyrillic: Байшинт хот) is a prefecture-level city in eastern Inner Mongolia, People's Republic of China. However, the city proper made of Horqin district, had 921,808 inhabitants. The city was the administrative centre of the defunct Jirem League.

The original Mongolian name for Tongliao city proper (i.e. Horqin District) is Bayisingtu, while the original name of the prefecture-level city is Jirem. The Mongolian dialect spoken in this area is Khorchin Mongolian.

History
Human settlement in Tongliao and the surrounding Khorchin area dates from at least 1000 BC. The Donghu people, a tribe who spoke a proto-Mongolian language, settled in today's Tongliao area, north of Yan during the Warring States period. their culture was associated with the Upper Xiajiadian culture, characterized by the practice of agriculture and animal husbandry supplemented by handicrafts and bronze art. Later, the Tongliao area was controlled by Xiongnu, Xianbei, and Khitan tribes.

After the Mongolian Khanate had established the Yuan Dynasty in Chinese territory, Tongliao was put under the jurisdiction of Liaoyang province, whose provincial capital was in today's Liaoning Province. In the early Qing period, Khorchin, Dörbod, Jalaid and Gorlos tribes met in Jirem to establish an alliance, and the Jirem League was founded in 1636 to administer Khorchin territory. The Jirem League had jurisdiction over six Khorchin banners, two Gorlos banners, one Dorbod banner and one Jalaid banner. During the Republican period, the Jirem League and the surrounding Khorchin area was controlled by the Fengtian and Liaoning provinces.

In 1918, Tongliao County was first established under the administration of the Jirem League and Fengtian province. After the Japanese Kwantung Army invaded Manchuria in 1931, a Japanese-controlled puppet state Manchukuo was established in Hsinking, 280 kilometers away from today's Tongliao urban area. The Manchukuo government set up Xing'an Province and soon divided it into four parts, in order to govern the western part of former Heilongjiang, Jilin and Fengtian provinces. These Xing'an provinces roughly overlap today's eastern part of Inner Mongolia, including today's Hulunbuir League, Xingan League, Chifeng and Tongliao. After the dissolution of the Manchukuo state, the Jirem League was governed by Liaoning and Liaobei provinces until Ulanhu established Inner Mongolia in Ulanhot, governing eastern Mongolian areas including the Hulunbuir, Jirem and Ju'ud leagues. After 1969, the Jirem League was put under the administration of Jilin province administration for 10 years until 1979. In 1999, the Jirem League became defunct and changed its name to Tongliao city, which was set up a prefecture-level city.

In 1924, Oomoto leader Onisaburo Deguchi, Aikido founder Morihei Ueshiba, and Lu Zhankui were arrested by Chinese authorities in Tongliao. Lu and his men were executed by firing squad, but Deguchi and Ueshiba were released into the customer of the Japanese consul.

Geography and climate
Tongliao spans latitude 42°15'45°41' and longitude 119°15'123°43', and borders Jilin province to the east, Liaoning to the south, Chifeng to the southwest, the Xilin Gol League to the west, and the Hinggan League to the north. Not far from Tongliao are silica sands.

Tongliao's topography primarily consists of plains, though the northern stretch of the prefecture extends into the eastern foothills of the southern Greater Khingan. The central and eastern parts of the prefecture are marked by the plains of the Xiliao, Xinkai River, and Jiaolai rivers, collectively forming the Sanhe Plain.

Tongliao has a four-season, monsoon-influenced, continental steppe climate (Köppen BSk), with long, cold, windy, but dry winters, and hot, humid summers. Much of the year's rainfall occurs from June to August, and even then dry and sunny weather dominates in the city. With monthly percent possible sunshine ranging from 57% in July to 78% in January, sunshine is abundant year-round, with 3,054 hours of bright sunshine annually.

Subdivisions

Demographics
Ethnic groups in Tongliao, 2000 census.

Transport

Tongliao railway station is a railway hub in both Inner Mongolia and Northeast China. Tongliao-Beijing Railway conveniently connects the city with Beijing. There are also railways connecting Tongliao with Shenyang, Daqing and Jining. State Highway 111, State Highway 303, State Highway 304 and State Highway 204 run through the city and extend to harbor cities such as Tianjin, Dalian, and Qinhuangdao. The city is served by Tongliao Airport.

Education
The Inner Mongolia University for Nationalitiesand Inner Mongolia College of Farming and Animal Husbandry (merged into the Inner Mongolia University for Nationalities) are among the educational institutions of Tongliao.

Additionally Tongliao Mongolian Middle School is there.

Points of interest
Zhurihe Ranch (珠日河牧場)
Daqinggou (大青溝)

Every summer, the Naadam festival is held at Tongliao's Zhurihe Ranch.

Notable people
Gada Meiren

References

External links
 Tungliyo Government (in Mongolian)
 Tongliao Government (in Chinese)
 www.tongliao.info (in Chinese)
 Tongliao Mongolian Middle School 

 
Cities in Inner Mongolia
Prefecture-level divisions of Inner Mongolia